Tiawan Mullen (born July 12, 2000) is an American football defensive back for the Indiana Hoosiers.

Early life and high school career
Tiawan Mullen was born on July 12, 2000, in Fort Lauderdale, Florida. He attended Coconut Creek High School in Coconut Creek, Florida, and was team captain for three years. An honor roll student, Mullen was named first-team All-County as a senior and compiled 112 career tackles. He also recorded 13 career interceptions, three returned for touchdowns, and forced five fumbles.

College career
Mullen received several scholarship offers after high school, including from Indiana, Nebraska, and Pittsburgh. He accepted an offer from Indiana University in September 2018. He saw immediate playing time as true freshman in 2019, placing second nationally among freshmen with 13 pass breakups. He was a starter in eight out of the team's thirteen games, and made 29 tackles, two forced fumbles, and two recoveries. Following the season Mullen was named honorable mention All-Big Ten,  first-team The Athletic Freshman All-American, and Indiana's defensive newcomer of the year.

As a sophomore in 2020, Mullen made 38 tackles, 3.5 sacks, three interceptions, and four pass breakups and was named first-team All-American at the end of the season. He also was named Indiana's most outstanding defensive player of the year, and was a first-team All-Big Ten selection. In the 2021 season, Mullen appeared in the first six games, making 19 tackles, before being sidelined with an injury.

Personal life
Mullen's brother, Trayvon, currently plays in the National Football League (NFL) for the Arizona Cardinals. Another brother, Trevell, is teammates with Tiawan at Indiana.

References

2000 births
Living people
Players of American football from Fort Lauderdale, Florida
American football defensive backs
Indiana Hoosiers football players